Travancore–Cochin, or Thiru–Kochi, was a short-lived state of India (1949–1956). It was originally called United State of Travancore and Cochin following the merger of two former kingdoms, Travancore and Cochin on 1 July 1949. Its original capital was Thiruvananthapuram. It was renamed State of Travancore–Cochin in January 1950. Travancore merged with erstwhile princely state of Cochin to form Travancore–Cochin in 1950. The five Tamil-majority Taluks of Vilavancode, Kalkulam, Thovalai, Agastheeswaram, and Sengottai were transferred from Travancore-Cochin to Madras State in 1956. The Malayalam-speaking regions of the Travancore–Cochin merged with the Malabar District (excluding Laccadive & Minicoy Islands) and the Kasaragod Taluk of South Canara district in Madras State to form the modern Malayalam-state of Kerala on 1 November 1956, according to the States Reorganisation Act, 1956 passed by the Government of India.

History
Paravur T. K. Narayana Pillai, the Congress Prime Minister of Travancore, became the Chief Minister of Travancore–Cochin. First elections were held in 1951 and A. J. John, Anaparambil from Congress party was elected as the Chief Minister, ruling until 1954.

The ruler of Travancore was appointed as the governor (known as "Rajpramukh") of Travancore–Cochin. The Maharajah of Cochin was offered to be addressed as Uparaja Pramukh, but he did not want any title after handing over the power. The Maharaja politely said that the eldest member of Cochin Royal Family should be called Valiya Thampuran and gave up royal powers unconditionally for the good of the people. While Pattom A. Thanu Pillai was the Praja Socialist Party Chief minister in 1954, Travancore Tamil Nadu Congress launched a campaign for the merger of the Tamil-speaking regions of Southern Travancore with the neighbouring area of Madras State. The agitation took a violent turn and civilians and local police were killed at Marthandam and Puthukkada, irreparably alienating the entire Tamil-speaking population from merger into Travancore–Cochin.

Under State Reorganisation Act of 1956, the four southern taluks of Travancore, namely Thovalai, Agasteeswaram, Kalkulam and Vilavancode and a part of the Chencotta, Tenkasi Taluk was merged with Madras State. On 1 November 1956 Travancore–Cochin was joined with Malabar District of Madras State to form the new state of Kerala, with a governor, appointed by the President of India, as the head of the state instead of 'Rajapramukh'.

Merger of Kanyakumari with Madras State

Tamils lived in large numbers in the Thovalai, Agastheeswaram, Sengottai, Eraniel, Vilavancode, Kalkulam, Devikulam, Neyyattinkara, Thiruvananthapuram South and Thiruvananthapuram North taluks of erstwhile Travancore State. In the Tamil regions, Malayalam was the official language and there were only a few Tamil-medium schools. So the Tamils met many hardships. Travancore State Government continued rejecting the requests of Tamils. During that period, the Travancore State Congress favoured the idea of uniting all the Malayalam speaking regions and the formation of a "Unified Kerala". In protest against this idea, many Tamil leaders vacated the party. Tamils gathered together at Nagercoil on 16 December 1945 under the leadership of Sam Nathaniel and formed the new political party All Travancore Tamilian Congress. That party was continuously compelling for the merger of Tamil regions in Travancore with Tamil Nadu.

In the working committee meeting of Tamilian congress at Eraviputhur on 30 June 1946, the name of the political party was changed to Travancore Tamil Nadu Congress (T.T.N.C). T.T.N.C was popular among the Tamils living in Thovalai and Agateeswaram Taluks. Mr. Ma. Po. Sivagnanam (Ma.Po.Si) was the only leader from Tamil Nadu who functioned in favour of T.T.N.C. After the independence of India, State Assembly Elections were announced in Travancore. As a consequence, T.T.N.C improved its popularity among Tamils. A popular and leading advocate from Vilavancode Mr. A. Nesamony organised a meeting of his supporters at Allan Memorial Hall, Nagercoil on 8 September 1947. In that meeting it was declared that they must achieve their objective through their political organisation, the T.T.N.C. And T.T.N.C started gaining strength and momentum in Kalkulam - Vilavancode Taluks. During the election propaganda campaign, clashes occurred between the  Tamil Nadar community and the  Malayali Nair community at various places in Kalkulam - Vilavancode Taluks. police force suppressed the agitating Nadars. In February 1948 the police opened fire and two Tamil speaking Nadars were killed. 
T.T.N.C won in 14 constituencies in the election to the State Legislative Assembly. Mr. A. Nesamony was elected as the legislative leader of the party. Then under his leadership, the awakened Tamil population was prepared to undergo any sacrifice to achieve their goal.

In 1950, a meeting was held at Palayamkottai to make compromises between state congress and T.T.N.C. The meeting met with failure and Mr. Sam Nathaniel resigned from the post of president of T.T.N.C Mr. P. Ramasamy Pillai, a strong follower of Mr. A. Nesamony was elected as the New President. The first general election of Independent India was held on 1952. T.T.N.C won 8 legislative assembly seats. Mr. A. Chidambaranathan became the minister on behalf of T.T.N.C in the coalition state government formed by the Congress. In the parliamentary Constituency Mr. A. Nesamony was elected as M.P. and in the Rajyasabha seat. Mr. A. Abdul Razak was elected as M.P. on behalf of T.T.N.C. In due course, accusing the Congress government for not showing enough care the struggle of the Tamils, T.T.N.C had broken away from the coalition and the Congress government lost the majority. So fresh elections were announced. In 1954 elections, T.T.N.C gained victory in 12 constituencies. 
Pattom Thanu Pillai was the chief minister for Thiru - Kochi legislative assembly. He engaged hard measures against the agitations of Tamils. Especially the Tamils at Devikulam - Peermedu regions went through the atrocities of Travancore Police force. Condemning the attitude of the police, T.T.N.C leaders from Nagercoil went to Munnar and participated in agitations against the prohibitive orders. The leaders were arrested and an uncalm atmosphere prevailed in South Travancore.

On 11 August, Liberation Day celebrations were held at many places in South Travancore. Public meetings and processions were organised. Communists also collaborated with the agitation programmes. Police opened fire at the processions in Thoduvetty (Martandam) and Puthukadai. Nine Tamil volunteers were killed and thousands of T.T.N.C and communist sympathizers were arrested in various parts of Tamil main land. At the end, Pattom Thanu Pillai's ministry was toppled and normalcy returned to the Tamil regions. The central government had appointed Fazal Ali Commission(1953 dec) for the states reorganisation based on language. It submitted its report on 10 August 1955. Based on this report, Devikulam - Peermedu and Neyyattinkara Taluks were merged with Kerala state. On 1 November 1956 - four Taluks Thovalai, Agastheeswaram, Kalkulam, Vilavancode were recognised to form the New Kanyakumari District and merged with Tamil Nadu State. Half of Sengottai Taluk was merged with Tirunelveli District. The main demand of T.T.N.C was to merger the Tamil regions with Tamil Nadu and major part of its demand was realised. So T.T.N.C was dissolved thereafter.

Retainment of Devikulam and Peerumedu Taluks in Kerala

Apart from Kanyakumari district, the Taluks of Devikulam and Peermade in present-day Idukki district also had a Tamil-majority until the late 1940s. The T.T.N.C had also requested to merge these Taluks with Madras State. However it was due to some decisions of Pattom Thanu Pillai, who was the first prime minister of Travancore, that they retained in the modern-state of Kerala. Pattom came up with a colonisation project to re-engineer the demography of Cardamom Hills. His colonisation project was to relocate 8,000 Malayalam-speaking families into the Taluks of Devikulam and Peermade. About 50,000 acres in these Taluks, which were Tamil-majority area, were chosen for the colonisation project. As a victory of the Colonisation project done by post-independence Travancore, these two Taluks and a larger portion of Cardamom Hills retained in the state of Kerala, after States Reorganisation Act, 1956.

Chief Ministers

Subdivisions
The state had 4 districts which were divided into 36 taluks.

References

Further reading
 

 
History of Kochi
Kingdom of Travancore
Kingdom of Cochin
History of Kerala (1947–present)
History of Thiruvananthapuram
History of Tamil Nadu (1947–present)
Former states and territories of India